Carranzar Naa Okailey Shooter (born August 6, 1989) is the Ghanaian model and beauty queen who won Miss Ghana 2012. She is known for placing third at the Miss World 2013 pageant in Indonesia. Her performance as the second runner-up in the competition is the highest a Ghanaian beauty queen has achieved in the Miss World pageant history.

Miss Ghana pageant controversy 
Ghanaian actress Yvonne Okoro, whose sister Roseline Okoro competed in the 2012 pageant, accused the organizers of the pageant of vote-rigging in favor of Shooter.

Pageantry
Miss World 2013 AwardsBeauty with a Purpose (finalist)Beach Fashion (2nd Runner-Up)

References

Ghanaian beauty pageant winners
1989 births
Living people
Miss World 2013 delegates